Eric Poole (1885–1916) was a Canada-born British officer who was executed during the First World War.

Eric Poole may also refer to:
Eric Poole (Australian politician) (1942–2021), Australian politician
Eric Joseph Poole (1907–1969), Canadian politician
Eric Poole (footballer) (1903–1968), Australian rules footballer